Aethes shakibai is a moth of the family Tortricidae. It is only known from the Miankaleh peninsula at the Caspian Sea in northern Iran. The species was discovered in 2001 and described in 2004. It was named for Ing. Mahmood Shakiba from Iran.

Its food plants are unknown.

References

External links

shakibai
Moths described in 2004
Moths of Asia
Endemic fauna of Iran